In Chile, the terms campamento (camp or tent city) and población callampa (mushroom town) are used to refer to shanty towns that emerged rapidly between the 1960s and 1980s. Today, campamento has replaced the term mushroom town.

Definition

NGO Un Techo para Chile defines a campamento as a group of basic and rudimentary dwellings that house at least eight families. These settlements lack at least one essential service, such as drinking water, electricity, or wastewater treatment, and are illegally occupying the land.

Population

In 2004, there were 531 campamentos in Chile, with 27,785 houses accommodating 32,371 families. An estimated 75% of this population lived below the national poverty line, and 41% were in extreme poverty. By 2011, the number of campamentos had risen to 657, housing 27,378 families. In 2018, there were 822 campamentos, home to 46,423 families.

Between 2010 and 2020, the total number of campamentos increased by 22%. The highest growth was seen in cities such as Antofagasta, Calama, Copiapó, Iquique-Alto Hospicio, La Serena, Valparaíso, and Viña del Mar.

See also 
 Squatting in Chile

References

Society of Chile
Populated places in Chile
Human habitats
Shanty towns in South America
Slums in South America
Buildings and structures in Santiago
Types of administrative division
Geography of Santiago, Chile
Squatting